Gaillardia pinnatifida, the Hopi blanketflower or red dome blanketflower, is a perennial plant in the sunflower family (Asteraceae) found in northern Mexico  (Chihuahua, Coahuila, Durango, Sonora) and in the south-central and southwestern United States (from southwestern Kansas south to central Texas and west as far as southern Nevada).

Description 
The ray flowers are three-lobed, often deeply.

Gaillardia pinnatifida displays considerable variation across its range, so much so that some authors have divided G. pinnatifida into varieties or distinct species. These taxa intergrade with each other, so Flora of North America and the Kew Garden Plant List does not recognise any of these as separate taxa. Many populations in Arizona have unlobed leaves, unlike the deeply divided leaves farther to the north, and populations in Utah have yellow rather than brown or purple disc flowers, as well as gland-dots in the leaves.

Habitat
Gaillardia pinnatifida can be found in blackbrush scrub, mixed shrub-grasslands, and pinyon juniper woodland communities.

References

External links
Southwest Colorado Wildflowers
Plants for a Future
U.S. National Park Service, Arches National Park:  Hopi Blanketflower—Red dome Blanketflower

pinnatifida
Flora of Northeastern Mexico
Flora of the Southwestern United States
Flora of the Great Plains (North America)
Flora of the United States
Flora of the South-Central United States
Flora of Sonora
Plants described in 1827
Taxa named by John Torrey
Flora without expected TNC conservation status